The Tour du Sahel is a multi-day road cycling race annually held in Mauritania, in the Sahel region. The race was first held in 2018. Since 2023 it has been held as a 2.2 category event on the UCI Africa Tour.

Winners

References

Cycle races in Mauritania
Recurring sporting events established in 2018
UCI Africa Tour races